Lasgerdi is one of the local languages of Semnan Province in northwestern Iran.

Notes

Northwestern Iranian languages